Albert “The Hurricane” Kraus (born August 3, 1980) is a Dutch welterweight kickboxer. He was the first K-1 World MAX Tournament Champion in 2002 and also the first SUPERKOMBAT Middleweight Champion. Kraus has also held four separate world titles in kickboxing and Muay Thai. He is currently fighting out of Super Pro Gym.

Biography and career 
Albert Kraus started boxing at 14 years old, later switching over to kickboxing aged 17 fighting out of Gino Albert Gym in Oss. In 1997 he had his first amateur fight, winning convincingly by first-round knockout. After numerous amateur victories Kraus switched to Bully's Gym in Rhenen. He made his professional debut in 1999 in Rotterdam, defeating his opponent Kany via second-round knockout. By 2001 he had won the Dutch F.I.M.A.C, European I.K.B.F and W.K.A World titles.

Kraus made his K-1 debut on February 24, 2002, at the K-1 World Grand Prix 2002 Preliminary Netherlands and was invited to the inaugural K-1 MAX World Championship on May 11, 2002.  In the tournament quarter finals he faced Shane Chapman from New Zealand and won the evenly fought battle by a single point on the three judges' cards to take a unanimous decision. In the semi finals Albert Kraus met local crowd favourite Masato.  Kraus scored a down with a punch at 2:31 into the first round and held on to earn his second consecutive unanimous decision and advance to the finals.  He needed just one minute to put Kaolan Kaovichit down with a punch combination to become the first-ever K-1 World Max Champion.

In 2003 Kraus switched to Super Pro Gym.  He entered the K-1 World MAX 2003 World Tournament as reigning champion and tournament favourite.  Kraus defeated both of his opponents by stoppage en route to the final but was unable to retain his title, losing to Masato by knockout at 2:26 of the second round.  After the tournament Albert Kraus would continue fighting in a number of events in K-MAX and Super League, winning seven straight bouts through 2003 and 2004 and qualifying for the K-1 World MAX 2004 World Tournament Final where he would reach the semi finals.  The following year, Albert Kraus would once more take part in the K-1 World MAX 2005 Championship defeating John Wayne Parr in the quarter finals only to lose to Thai fighter Buakaw Por. Pramuk in the semi finals.  Despite the disappointment of another semi final defeat, Kraus would finish the year on a high by defeating Menno Dijkstra at Kraus's hometown of Oss to win the I.K.B.A. world title.

2006 would be a mixed year for Albert Kraus.  He suffered an early exit at the quarter final stage of the K-1 World MAX 2006 World Championship to Gago Drago but did manage to regain his I.K.B.A. World title by defeating James Martinez.  2007 started badly for Albert as he lost two straight fights, including a shock decision loss to little known Japanese fighter Tatsuji.  He improved as the year progressed qualifying for the 6th annual K-1 World MAX Final on October 3, 2007.  Kraus fought and defeated Yoshihiro Sato by decision in the quarter finals and in the semis he met 2005 Champion Andy Souwer and lost the battle by majority decision.  Souwer went on to fight Masato in the finals and eventually won the championship.

Kraus had a stuttering start to 2008, losing his World Full Contact Association (W.F.C.A.) Thai Boxing junior middleweight world title fight to Faldir Chahbari and missing out on qualification for the K-1 MAX World Final for the very first time by losing to Buakaw Por. Pramuk at the K-1 World MAX 2008 World Championship Tournament Final 16.  Losing out on a place at the final seemed to re-invigorate Kraus as he went on a seven match winning streak throughout 2008 and the beginning of 2009 – a streak that included winning the 2008 "King Of The Ring" Welterweight World title. He finally tasted defeat at the K-1 World MAX 2009 Final 8 quarter final stage to eventual champion Giorgio Petrosyan.  Since that defeat Albert Kraus has won five straight and has booked his place in the quarter finals of the forthcoming K-1 World MAX 2010 Final by defeating Hiroki Nakajima by decision at the K-1 World MAX 2010 World Championship Tournament Final 16. He again tasted defeat at the K-1 World MAX 2010 quarter final stage to the reigning champion Giorgio Petrosyan who would go on to win the tournament.

He knocked out Ekapop Sor Klinmee in round 1 at Fighterzone Kickboxing World Series MAX in Singapore on February 25, 2012.

He lost against Abraham Roqueñi on April 28, 2012, in Torrelavega, Spain at a 70 kg contest.

He was drawn against Sanny Dahlbeck in the quarter-finals of the Glory 3: Rome - 2012 Middleweight Slam Final 8 to be held on November 3, 2012, in Rome, Italy. However, he was struck down with the flu in the week leading up to tournament and had to be replaced by Yoshihiro Sato.

On December 31, 2012, Kraus won a Wu Lin Feng eight-man tournament in Beijing, China. He was drawn against 18-year-old Zhang Zhao Yu in the quarter-finals, and was able to wear the youngster down and stop him in the third round with a series of body punches. In the semis, he forced two first-round referee counts on Wang Wei Hao, who was also deducted a point for using a Sanshou-style takedown on Kraus. Behind heavily on the scorecards, Wang's corner stopped him from continuing at the end of round one and Kraus marched into the finals to face Dong Wen Fei. Kraus dropped Dong three times before finishing him off with a high kick in round two to win the tournament and $100,000 prize money.

He was set to fight Andy Ristie at Glory 5: London on March 23, 2013, in London, England but Ristie was forced to withdraw due to visa issues and replaced by Warren Stevelmans. Kraus defeated Stevelmans via unanimous decision.

The Kraus-Ristie fight was rescheduled for Glory 8: Tokyo - 2013 65kg Slam on May 3, 2013. Ristie KO'd Kraus with a knee in round two.

Kraus was to fight Jordan Watson at Glory 10: Los Angeles - Middleweight World Championship Tournament in Ontario, California, United States on September 28, 2013 but Watson was unable to compete due to visa issues and was replaced by Ky Hollenbeck. He lost by unanimous decision.

He lost to Aikpracha Meenayothin by split decision at Glory 14: Zagreb in Zagreb, Croatia on March 8, 2014.

Kraus rematched Zheng Zhaoyu at Kunlun 5 in Chengdu, China on June 1, 2014, and defeated him once again, knocking him out with a second round knee.

He beat Erkan Varol via unanimous decision at Qabala Fight Series #1 in Qabala, Azerbaijan on June 29, 2014.

Titles
 2012 WLF-World 8 Man Tournament Champion (-70 kg)
 2011 SUPERKOMBAT Middleweight Championship (-72 kg)
 2008 W.I.P.U. "King Of The Ring" Muay Thai Super Welterweight World Champion (-70 kg)
 2005-06 I.K.B.A. Thai-Boxing World Champion -70 kg (1 title defense)
2003 K-1 World MAX Finalist
2002 K-1 World MAX Champion
 2001 W.K.A. World Champion
 W.P.K.A. Benelux Champion 2000
 First SUPERKOMBAT Middleweight Champion
 First SUPERKOMBAT Champion

Professional kickboxing record

|-  style="background:#fbb;"
| 2022-12-28|| Loss ||align=left| Mason Hide Usami || INOKI BOM-BA-YE × Ganryujima || Tokyo, Japan || Decision (Unanimous) || 3 || 3:00
|-  style="background:#fbb;"
| 2019-05-24|| Loss ||align=left| Michael Krcmar ||  Heroes Gate 22	 || Prague, Czech Republic || Decision  || 3 || 3:00
|-  style="background:#fbb;"
| 2018-07-13|| Loss ||align=left| Adsalam Barkinkhoev || ACB KB 16 || Romania || Decision  || 3 || 3:00
|-  style="background:#fbb;"
| 2018-05-13|| Loss ||align=left| Li Zhuangzhuang || Kunlun Fight 74 || China || Decision (Split) || 3 || 3:00
|-  style="background:#fbb;"
| 2018-02-17|| Loss ||align=left| Nordin Ben Moh || Enfusion 5th Anniversary || Eindhoven, Netherlands ||Decision (Unanimous) || 3 || 3:00
|-  style="background:#cfc;"
| 2017-11-05|| Win ||align=left| Li Zhuangzhuang || Kunlun Fight 66 || China || Decision (Unanimous) || 3 || 3:00
|-  style="background:#cfc;"
| 2016-09-24|| Win ||align=left| Ma Shuo|| Kunlun Fight 53 || Beijing, China || KO (Left Body Hook) || 2 || 2:15
|-  style="background:#fbb;"
| 2016-08-07 || Loss ||align=left| Hinata Watanabe || Kunlun Fight 49 / Rebels 45 || Tokyo, Japan || Decision (Unanimous) || 3 || 3:00
|-  style="background:#cfc;"
| 2016-06-25 || Win ||align=left| Li Zhuangzhuang || Kunlun Fight 46 || Kunming, China || Decision || 3 || 3:00
|-  style="background:#fbb;"
| 2016-03-20 || Loss ||align=left| Gu Hui || Kunlun Fight 39 || Dongguan, China || Ext. R Decision (Split) || 4 || 3:00 
|-  style="background:#cfc;"
| 2016-01-09 || Win ||align=left| Liu Mingzhi || Kunlun Fight 36 || Shanghai, China || KO || 3 || 
|-  style="background:#cfc;"
| 2015-10-16 || Win ||align=left| Marius Tiţă || ACB KB 3: Grand Prix Final || Sibiu, Romania || Decision (unanimous) || 3 || 3:00
|-  style="background:#cfc;"
| 2015-07-19 || Win ||align=left| Zhao Yan || Kunlun Fight 28 || Nanjing, China || TKO || 2 ||
|-  style="background:#cfc;"
| 2015-03-08 || Win ||align=left| Yokoyama Gō || K-LEGEND 2015 Okayama || Okayama, Japan || KO (punches) || 3 || 2:47
|-  style="background:#fbb;"
| 2015-01-31 || Loss ||align=left| Zhou Zhipeng || Wu Lin Feng World Championship 2015 || Chongqing, China || Decision (unanimous) || 3 || 3:00
|-  style="background:#cfc;"
| 2014-11-16 || Win ||align=left| Li Yankun || Kunlun Fight 13 || Hohhot, China || Decision (unanimous) || 3 || 3:00
|-  style="background:#cfc;"
| 2014-06-29 || Win ||align=left| Erkan Varol || Qabala Fight Series #1 || Qabala, Azerbaijan || Decision (unanimous) || 3 || 3:00
|-  style="background:#cfc;"
| 2014-06-01 || Win ||align=left| Zheng Zhaoyu || Kunlun Fight 5 || Chengdu, China || KO (right knee) || 2 || 0:55
|-  style="background:#fbb;"
| 2014-03-08 || Loss ||align=left| Aikpracha Meenayothin || Glory 14: Zagreb || Zagreb, Croatia || Decision (split) || 3 || 3:00
|-  style="background:#fbb;"
| 2014-01-18 || Loss ||align=left| Seyedisa Alamdarnezam || WLF World 70 kg 8 Man Tournament, Quarter Finals || Hubei, China || Decision (majority) || 3 ||3:00
|-  style="background:#fbb;"
| 2013-09-28 || Loss ||align=left| Ky Hollenbeck || Glory 10: Los Angeles || Ontario, California, USA || Decision (unanimous) || 3 || 3:00
|-  style="background:#fbb;"
| 2013-05-03 || Loss ||align=left| Andy Ristie || Glory 8: Tokyo || Tokyo, Japan || KO (knee) || 2||  2:27
|-  style="background:#cfc;"
| 2013-03-23 || Win ||align=left| Warren Stevelmans || Glory 5: London || London, England || Decision (unanimous) || 3 || 3:00 
|-  style="background:#cfc;"
| 2013-01-01 || Win ||align=left| Dong Wenfei || Wu Lin Feng 70 kg Tournament, Final || Beijing, China || KO (right high kick) || 2 || 2:45 
|-
! style=background:white colspan=9|
|-  style="background:#cfc;"
| 2012-12-31 || Win ||align=left| Wang Weihao || Wu Lin Feng 70 kg Tournament, Semi Finals || Beijing, China || TKO (corner stoppage) || 1 || 3:00
|-  style="background:#cfc;"
| 2012-12-31 || Win ||align=left| Zheng Zhaoyu || Wu Lin Feng 70 kg Tournament, Quarter Finals || Beijing, China || TKO (punches to the body) || 3 || 
|-  style="background:#cfc;"
| 2012-05-26 || Win ||align=left| Mohamed El-Mir || Glory 1: Stockholm – 70 kg Slam Tournament, First Round || Stockholm, Sweden || Decision || 3 || 3:00
|-  style="background:#fbb;"
| 2012-04-14 ||  Loss ||align=left| Abraham Roqueñi || Born To Fight || Torrelavega, Spain || Decision (unanimous) || 3 || 3:00
|-  style="background:#cfc;"
| 2012-02-25 || Win ||align=left| Ekapop Sor Klinmee || Fighterzone Kickboxing World Series MAX || Singapore || KO (right uppercut) || 1 || 
|-  style="background:#cfc;"
| 2011-11-19 || Win ||align=left| Alexander Schmitt || SUPERKOMBAT World Grand Prix 2011 Final || Darmstadt, Germany || KO (punches) || 2 || 2:37
|-
! style=background:white colspan=9|
|-  style="background:#fbb;"
| 2011-09-25 || Loss ||align=left| Yūji Nashiro || K-1 World MAX 2011 -70kg Japan Tournament Final, Quarter-final || Osaka, Japan|| Decision (Unanimous) || 3 || 3:00
|-  style="background:#fbb;"
| 2011-06-25 || Loss ||align=left| Yoshihiro Sato || K-1 World MAX 2011 -63kg Japan Tournament Final, Super fight || Tokyo, Japan|| Decision (Majority) || 3 || 3:00
|-  style="background:#cfc;"
| 2011-05-21 || Win ||align=left| Marius Tiţă || SUPERKOMBAT World Grand Prix I 2011 || Bucharest, Romania|| KO (right high kick) || 1 || 1:55
|-  style="background:#fbb;"
| 2011-03-12 || Loss ||align=left| Batu Khasikov || Fight Nights: Battle of Moscow 3 || Moscow, Russia|| Decision (unanimous) || 3 || 3:00
|-  style="background:#cfc;"
| 2010-11-27 || Win ||align=left| Mohammed Gur || Mix Fight Gala XI || Sindelfingen, Germany|| Decision || 3 || 3:00
|-  style="background:#fbb;"
| 2010-11-08 || Loss ||align=left| Giorgio Petrosyan || K-1 World MAX 2010 Final || Tokyo, Japan ||  Decision (unanimous) || 3 || 3:00
|-  style="background:#cfc;"
| 2010-07-05 || Win ||align=left| Hiroki Nakajima || K-1 World MAX 2010 Final 16 – Part 1 || Tokyo, Japan || Decision (unanimous) || 3 || 3:00
|-
! style=background:white colspan=9 |
|-  style="background:#cfc;"
| 2010-06-12 || Win ||align=left| Tefik Sucu || Beast of the East 2010 Poland || Gdynia, Poland || KO (left + right hook) || 1 || 0:31
|-  style="background:#cfc;"
| 2010-03-07 || Win ||align=left| William Diender || Time For Action presents: Team SuperPro 10 Year Anniversary || Nijmegen, Netherlands || Decision (Unanimous) || 3 || 3:00
|-  style="background:#cfc;"
| 2009-12-12 || Win ||align=left| Jan Mazur || K-1 ColliZion 2009 Final Tournament, Super Fight || Prague, Czech Republic || TKO (ref stop/3 knockdowns) || 3 || 1:30
|-  style="background:#cfc;"
| 2009-10-26 || Win ||align=left| Kozo Takeda || K-1 World MAX 2009 World Championship Final || Yokohama, Japan || TKO (Ref Stop) || 2 || 2:19
|-  style="background:#fbb;"
| 2009-07-13 || Loss ||align=left| Giorgio Petrosyan || K-1 World MAX 2009 Final 8 || Fukuoka, Japan || Decision (unanimous) || 3 || 3:00
|-
! style=background:white colspan=9 |
|-  style="background:#cfc;"
| 2009-04-21 || Win ||align=left| Yuichiro Nagashima || K-1 World MAX 2009 Final 16 || Fukuoka, Japan || KO (punches) || 1 || 1:04
|-
! style=background:white colspan=9 |
|-  style="background:#cfc;"
| 2009-02-23 || Win ||align=left| Su Hwan Lee || K-1 World MAX 2009 Japan Tournament || Tokyo, Japan || Decision (unanimous) || 3 || 3:00
|-  style="background:#cfc;"
| 2009-01-24 || Win ||align=left| Warren Stevelmans || Beast Of The East 2009 || Zutphen, Netherlands || Decision || 3 || 3:00
|-  style="background:#cfc;"
| 2008-11-29 || Win ||align=left| Buakaw Por. Pramuk || It's Showtime 2008 Eindhoven || Eindhoven, Netherlands || Decision || 3 || 3:00
|-  style="background:#cfc;"
| 2008-10-01 || Win ||align=left| Yasuhiro Kido || K-1 World MAX 2008 World Championship Tournament Reserve Fight || Tokyo, Japan || TKO (doc stop) || 2 || 0:48
|-  style="background:#cfc;"
| 2008-07-07 || Win ||align=left| Mike Zambidis || K-1 World MAX 2008 World Championship Tournament Final 8 || Tokyo, Japan || TKO (doc stop/cut) || 3 || 3:00
|-  style="background:#cfc;"
| 2008-05-24 || Win ||align=left| Ali Gunyar || Gentleman Promotions Fightnight || Tilburg, Netherlands || KO (knee strike) || 2 ||
|-
! style=background:white colspan=9 |
|-  style="background:#fbb;"
| 2008-04-09 || Loss ||align=left| Buakaw Por. Pramuk || K-1 World MAX 2008 World Championship Tournament Final 16 ||Tokyo, Japan || Ext.R Decision (unanimous) || 4 || 3:00
|-
! style=background:white colspan=9 |
|-  style="background:#fbb;"
| 2008-01-26 || Loss ||align=left| Faldir Chahbari || Beast of the East 2008 || Zutphen, Netherlands || Decision || 5 || 3:00
|-
! style=background:white colspan=9 |
|-  style="background:#cfc;"
| 2007-12-16 || Win ||align=left| Özkan Kose || KlasH Champions Battlefield IV || Oss, Netherlands || Decision || 3 || 3:00
|-  style="background:#fbb;"
| 2007-10-03 || Loss ||align=left| Andy Souwer || K-1 World MAX 2007 World Championship Semi Finals || Tokyo, Japan || Decision (majority) || 3 || 3:00
|-  style="background:#cfc;"
| 2007-10-03 || Win ||align=left| Yoshihiro Sato || K-1 World MAX 2007 World Championship Quarter Finals || Tokyo, Japan || Decision (unanimous) || 3 || 3:00
|-  style="background:#cfc;"
| 2007-07-21 || Win ||align=left| Han Wul Kim || K-1 Fighting Network KHAN 2007 || Seoul, South Korea || KO (high kick) || 1 || 2:03
|-  style="background:#cfc;"
| 2007-06-28 || Win ||align=left| Virgil Kalakoda || K-1 World MAX 2007 World Tournament Final Elimination || Tokyo, Japan || Decision (unanimous) || 3 || 3:00
|-
! style=background:white colspan=9 |
|-  style="background:#cfc;"
| 2007-05-20 || Win ||align=left| Peter Crooke || K-1 UK MAX Tournament 2007 Pain & Glory, Super Fight || London, England || Decision || 3 || 3:00
|-  style="background:#fbb;"
| 2007-04-04 || Loss ||align=left| Tatsuji || K-1 World MAX 2007 World Elite Showcase || Yokohama, Japan || Decision (unanimous) || 3 || 3:00
|-  style="background:#fbb;"
| 2007-02-05 || Loss ||align=left| Murat Direkci || K-1 World MAX 2007 Japan Tournament || Tokyo, Japan || KO (right hook) || 1 || 1:27
|-  style="background:#cfc;"
| 2006-12-17 || Win ||align=left| James Martinez || IKBO World Title Fight || Oss, Netherlands || TKO || 2 ||
|-
! style=background:white colspan=9 |
|-  style="background:#cfc;"
| 2006-11-24 || Win ||align=left| Osvaldo Palma || K-1 World MAX North European Qualification 2007 || Stockholm, Sweden || KO (punches) || 1 || 2:29
|-  style="background:#cfc;"
| 2006-09-04 || Win ||align=left| Yoshihiro Sato || K-1 World MAX 2006 Champions' Challenge || Tokyo, Japan || Decision (majority) || 3 || 3:00
|-  style="background:#fbb;"
| 2006-06-30 || Loss ||align=left| Gago Drago || K-1 World MAX 2006 World Championship Quarter Finals || Yokohama, Japan || Decision (unanimous) || 3 || 3:00
|-  style="background:#cfc;"
| 2006-04-05 || Win ||align=left| Ali Gunyar || K-1 World MAX 2006 World Tournament Open || Tokyo, Japan || Decision (unanimous) || 3 || 3:00
|-
! style=background:white colspan=9 |
|-  style="background:#cfc;"
| 2005-12-18 || Win ||align=left| Menno Dijkstra || I.K.B.A. World Championships || Oss, Netherlands || Decision (unanimous) || 5 || 3:00
|-
! style=background:white colspan=9 |
|-  style="background:#cfc;"
| 2005-11-05 || Win ||align=left| Chi Bin Lim || K-1 Fighting Network Korea MAX 2005 || Seoul, South Korea || Decision (unanimous) || 3 || 3:00
|-  style="background:#cfc;"
| 2005-10-12 || Win ||align=left| Akira Ohigashi || K-1 World MAX 2005 Champions' Challenge || Tokyo, Japan || KO (punches) || 2 || 1:31
|-  style="background:#fbb;"
| 2005-07-20 || Loss ||align=left| Buakaw Por. Pramuk || K-1 World MAX 2005 Championship Semi Finals || Yokohama, Japan || Decision (unanimous) || 3 || 3:00
|-  style="background:#cfc;"
| 2005-07-20 || Win ||align=left| John Wayne Parr || K-1 World MAX 2005 Championship Quarter Finals || Yokohama, Japan || Decision (unanimous) || 3 || 3:00
|-  style="background:#cfc;"
| 2005-05-04 || Win ||align=left| Virgil Kalakoda || K-1 World MAX 2005 World Tournament Open || Tokyo, Japan || Decision (unanimous) || 3 || 3:00
|-
! style=background:white colspan=9 |
|-  style="background:#cfc;"
| 2005-02-23 || Win ||align=left| Buakaw Por. Pramuk || K-1 World MAX 2005 Japan Tournament || Tokyo, Japan || Ext.R Decision (split) || 4 || 3:00
|-  style="background:#cfc;"
| 2004-12-18 || Win ||align=left| Jose Barradas || SuperLeague Netherlands 2004 || Uden, Netherlands || TKO (ref stop/3 knockdowns) || 1 || 2:37
|-  style="background:#fbb;"
| 2004-10-13 || Loss ||align=left| Takayuki Kohiruimaki || K-1 World MAX 2004 Champions' Challenge || Tokyo, Japan || Decision (unanimous) || 3 || 3:00
|-  style="background:#cfc;"
! style=background:white colspan=9 |
|-  style="background:#fbb;"
| 2004-07-07 || Loss ||align=left| Masato || K-1 World MAX 2004 World Tournament Semi Finals || Tokyo, Japan || Decision (unanimous) || 3 || 3:00
|-  style="background:#cfc;"
| 2004-07-07 || Win ||align=left| Shamil Gaidarbekov || K-1 World MAX 2004 World Tournament Quarter Finals || Tokyo, Japan || Decision (majority) || 3 || 3:00
|-  style="background:#cfc;"
| 2004-05-22 || Win ||align=left| Mikel Colaj || SuperLeague Switzerland 2004 || Winterthur, Switzerland || TKO || 4 || 3:00
|-  style="background:#cfc;"
| 2004-04-07 || Win ||align=left| Jadamba Narantungalag || K-1 World MAX 2004 World Tournament Open || Tokyo, Japan || Ext.R Decision (unanimous) || 4 || 3:00
|-
! style=background:white colspan=9 |
|-  style="background:#cfc;"
| 2004-02-24 || Win ||align=left| Takashi Ohno || K-1 World MAX 2004 Japan Tournament || Tokyo, Japan || KO (punches) || 1 || 2:31
|-  style="background:#cfc;"
| 2003-12-06 || Win ||align=left| Roman Logish || SuperLeague Netherlands 2003 || Rotterdam, Netherlands || TKO (corner stop) || 3 ||
|-  style="background:#cfc;"
| 2003-11-18 || Win ||align=left| Genki Sudo || K-1 World MAX 2003 Champions' Challenge || Tokyo, Japan || Decision (unanimous) || 3 || 3:00
|-  style="background:#cfc;"
| 2003-09-27 || Win ||align=left| Moussa Konaté || SuperLeague Germany 2003 || Wuppertal, Germany || TKO (corner stop) || 2 || 3:00
|-  style="background:#fbb;"
| 2003-07-05 || Loss ||align=left| Masato || K-1 World MAX 2003 World Tournament Final || Saitama, Japan || KO (left hook) || 2 || 2:26
|-
! style=background:white colspan=9 |
|-  style="background:#cfc;"
| 2003-07-05 || Win ||align=left| Duane Ludwig || K-1 World MAX 2003 World Tournament Semi Finals || Saitama, Japan || KO (left hook) || 3 || 1:33
|-  style="background:#cfc;"
| 2003-07-05 || Win ||align=left| Andy Souwer || K-1 World MAX 2003 World Tournament Quarter Finals || Saitama, Japan || TKO (Doc Stop) || 3 || 3:00
|-  style="background:#cfc;"
| 2003-05-24 || Win ||align=left| Martin Karaivanov || Heaven or Hell || Prague, Czech Republic || KO || 2 ||
|-  style="background:#fbb;"
| 2003-03-01 || Loss ||align=left| Mike Zambidis || K-1 World MAX 2003 Japan Grand Prix || Tokyo, Japan || KO (right hook) || 2 || 0:16
|-  style="background:#c5d2ea;"
| 2002-10-11 || Draw ||align=left| Masato || K-1 World MAX 2002 Champions' Challenge || Tokyo, Japan || Decision Draw || 5 || 3:00
|-  style="background:#cfc;"
| 2002-05-11 || Win ||align=left| Kaolan Kaovichit || K-1 World MAX 2002 World Tournament Final || Tokyo, Japan || KO (punches) || 1 || 1:00
|-
! style=background:white colspan=9 |
|-  style="background:#cfc;"
| 2002-05-11 || Win ||align=left| Masato || K-1 World MAX 2002 World Tournament Semi Finals || Tokyo, Japan || Decision (Unanimous) || 3 || 3:00
|-  style="background:#cfc;"
| 2002-05-11 || Win ||align=left| Shane Chapman || K-1 World MAX 2002 World Tournament Quarter Finals || Tokyo, Japan || Decision (Unanimous) || 3 || 3:00
|-  style="background:#cfc;"
| 2002-02-24 || Win ||align=left| Francis Itay || K-1 World Grand Prix 2002 Preliminary Netherlands || Arnhem, Netherlands || TKO || 2 || 1:46
|-  style="background:#fbb;"
| 2001-09-23 || Loss ||align=left| Kamal El Amrani || Battle of Arnhem III || Arnhem, Netherlands || Decision || 7 || 2:00
|-  style="background:#cfc;"
| 2000-09-03 || Win ||align=left| Franklin Beuk || "Veselic meets Dejpitak" || Rotterdam, Netherlands || Decision || 5 || 2:00
|-  style="background:#cfc;"
| 1999-02-07 || Win ||align=left| Kany || Matter of Honour || Rotterdam, Netherlands || KO || 2 ||
|-
| colspan=9 | Legend:

Boxing record

| style="text-align:center;" colspan="8"|5 Wins (4 knockouts, 1 decision), 0 Losses,0 Draws
|-  style="text-align:center; background:#e3e3e3;"
|  style="border-style:none none solid solid; "|Res.
|  style="border-style:none none solid solid; "|Record
|  style="border-style:none none solid solid; "|Opponent
|  style="border-style:none none solid solid; "|Type
|  style="border-style:none none solid solid; "|Rd., Time
|  style="border-style:none none solid solid; "|Date
|  style="border-style:none none solid solid; "|Location
|  style="border-style:none none solid solid; "|Notes
|- align=center
|Win
|align=center|9-39-1||align=left|Miroslav Kvocka
|
|
|
|align=left|
|align=left|
|- align=center
|Win
|align=center|4-23-1||align=left|Vladimir Tazik
|
|
|
|align=left|
|align=left|
|- align=center
|Win
|align=center|6-6-0||align=left|Nicky Jenman
|
|
|
|align=left|
|align=left|
|- align=center
|Win
|align=center|0-10-0||align=left|Joe Jones
|
|
|
|align=left|
|align=left|
|- align=center
|Win
|align=center|0-0-0||align=left|Valentin Cimpoeru
|
|
|
|align=left|
|align=left|
|- align=center

See also
List of K-1 events
List of male kickboxers
List of K-1 champions

References

External links
Albert Kraus official site
Fighters Profile of Albert Kraus
 

1980 births
Living people
Dutch male kickboxers
Welterweight kickboxers
Middleweight kickboxers
Middleweight boxers
Dutch Muay Thai practitioners
Sportspeople from Oss
Dutch male boxers
Glory kickboxers
Kunlun Fight kickboxers
SUPERKOMBAT kickboxers